Francesco Saverio Cavallari (1809 or 2 March 1810–1896), also known in Mexico as Javier Cavallari, was an architect, professor, painter and archeologist. He was active in Mexico City between 1857 and 1864.

Cavallari was born in Palermo, Sicily, but obtained a degree from the University of Göttingen. He became an art professor the University of Palermo, then at the Accademia di Belle Arti of Milan before becoming director of the Academia de San Carlos in Mexico City. He designed its present façade. He also designed the entrance arch at Parque Lira park.

He received membership in many archaeological and architectural societies across Europe.

References

Architects from Palermo
Mexican architects
Italian neoclassical architects
Archaeologists from Palermo
1809 births
1896 deaths